Andrés Bottiglieri (born 20 December 1988) is an Italian Argentine footballer.

Biography
Born in Córdoba, Argentina, Bottiglieri was signed by Italian Serie D team Sporting Genzano in September 2008. In December 2008 he left for Valle d'Aosta and scored 2 goals.

In August 2009, he was signed by fellow Serie D team Savona and won promotion to professional league as Group A champion.

Honours
Serie D: 2010 (Savona)

References

External links
 LaSerieD.com Profile 
 Football.it Profile 
 Video 

Argentine footballers
Argentine expatriate footballers
Savona F.B.C. players
Association football midfielders
Expatriate footballers in Italy
Citizens of Italy through descent
Argentine people of Italian descent
Footballers from Córdoba, Argentina
1988 births
Living people
F.C. Vado players